Pawnee is an unincorporated community in Medina County, in the U.S. state of Ohio.

History
Pawnee was originally called Esselburn's Corners, after Louis Esselburn, who started a general store there in 1872. A post office called Pawnee was established in 1879, and remained in operation until 1887.

References

Unincorporated communities in Medina County, Ohio
Unincorporated communities in Ohio